Zerachiel or Zachariel (Hebrew: זְכַרְאֵל Zəḵarʾēl, Tiberian: Zăḵarʾēl, God has remembered) also known as "Zakhariel" or "Saraqael" is one of the Archangels who leads souls to judgement. In Enoch I (the Book of Enoch) (Chapter 20) he is listed as one of the seven holy angels who watch; the angel who is set over the spirits who sin in the spirit. In the list of Pope Gregory I, one of the seven archangels is called Zachariel.

See also
 List of angels in theology
 (Injustice): Lucifer/Satan
 (Aspects of Justice)
 (Justice) Raguel)
 (Retribution) Angel of Death
 (Redemption) Zadkiel

References

Archangels
Individual angels